The men's 4×200 metre freestyle relay event at the 1952 Olympic Games took place from 28 to 29 July at the Swimming Stadium. The relay featured teams of four swimmers each swimming four lengths of the 50 m pool freestyle.

Medalists

Results

Heats

Heat One

Heat Two

Heat Three

Final

References

Swimming at the 1952 Summer Olympics
4 × 200 metre freestyle relay
Men's events at the 1952 Summer Olympics